First Lutheran Church of St. Ansgar is a historic church located at 212 N. Main Street in St. Ansgar, Iowa, United States. It  was added to the National Register in 1976.

St. Ansgar congregation was organized by pioneer Norwegian-American Lutheran minister  Claus Lauritz Clausen in Mitchell County, Iowa  on December 4, 1853. In 1856, a log house was built by the congregation for use as a school and church. A stone schoolhouse was built in 1858, which was used for church services until the stone church could be built. In 1864, work was started on the building of the stone church. The new church was completed and dedicated on September 27, 1868. A stone narthex was added to the building in 1941. In 1959, the building of the new First Lutheran Parish Center was started with completion in 1960.

References

Related reading
Swansen, H. Fred   (1949) The Founder of St. Ansgar: the Life Story of Claus Laurits Clausen (Blair, Nebraska: Lutheran Publishing House)

External links
 firstlutheranstansgar.com/First Lutheran Church of St. Ansgar website
https://www.facebook.com/First-Lutheran-Church-164244073627190/First Lutheran Church of St. Ansgar Facebook Page

Lutheran churches in Iowa
Churches on the National Register of Historic Places in Iowa
Gothic Revival church buildings in Iowa
Churches completed in 1868
Churches in Mitchell County, Iowa
Norwegian-American culture in Iowa
National Register of Historic Places in Mitchell County, Iowa